Kazakhstan competed at the 2015 World Championships in Athletics in Beijing, China, from 22 to 30 August 2015.

On 24 August Olga Rypakova won the bronze medal in the women's triple jump.

Medalists
The following Kazakhstani competitors won medals at the Championships

Results
(q – qualified, NM – no mark, SB – season best)

Men 
Track and road events

Field events

Women 
Track and road events

Field events

References

Nations at the 2015 World Championships in Athletics
World Championships in Athletics
Kazakhstan at the World Championships in Athletics